Alex Baldolini (born 24 January 1985) is an Italian motorcycle racer. He currently competes in the Supersport World Championship aboard a Honda CBR600RR.

Career statistics

Grand Prix motorcycle racing

Races by year
(key)

Supersport World Championship

Races by year

 * Season still in progress.

References

External links

Living people
1985 births
Italian motorcycle racers
125cc World Championship riders
250cc World Championship riders
Moto2 World Championship riders
Supersport World Championship riders